William Goode may refer to:

 William Goode (politician) (1798–1859), American politician and lawyer from Virginia
 William Goode, the elder (1762–1816), English clergyman
 William Goode (priest) (1801–1868), English churchman, Dean of Ripon 1860–1868, son of William Goode the elder
 William Goode (cricketer) (1881–1959), New Zealand cricketer
 William Allmond Codrington Goode (1907–1986), British colonial governor of Singapore and North Borneo
 William Thomas Goode (1859–1932), British academic, linguist and journalist
 Dunny Goode (1929–2004), football coach for Eastern New Mexico University

See also
William Good (disambiguation)